Akurana is a suburb of the city of Kandy in Kandy District, Central Province, Sri Lanka. Akurana lies along the A9 highway from Kandy to Matale, north of Katugastota. Geographically the town is surrounded by hills and rivers. The Balapitiya Oya, a tributary of Pinga Oya river, runs through Akurana.

Akurana belongs to the Harispattuwa Electorate and was represented in Parliament by a former Foreign Minister, Abdul Cader Shahul Hameed, for more than 33 years without interruption. Akurana area came under the local government authority of the Akurana Pradeshiya Sabhawa in the late 1980s and included the villages of Alawathugoda, Dunuwila, Pangollamada, Bulugohathenna, Waragashinna, Kurundugaha ela, Uggala, Kurugoda, Thelumbgahawaththa, Malgamandeniya and Dippitiya.

History
Local folklore has it that during the reign of a certain "Raja Sinha", three Arabs travelled inland to Kandy. The king allowed them to take three native wives, and the three Arabs settled Akurana. They would be the ancestors of the Moors of Akurana.

Its inhabitants lived through trade and were comparatively rich. A small Islamic school operated in 1886.

Demographics

Akurana is predominantly Muslim; there is also a sizable Sinhalese minority with small Tamil and Burgher communities. The majority of the local population speak Tamil, as well as Sinhala. English is widely understood and can be spoken by the local population.

Population by religion (2012) 

The majority of the population identify as Moors (Muslims). There is a sizable Sinhalese minority and a small numbers of Indian Tamils and Sri Lankan Tamils. Other communities includes Burghers, Malays, Chetties, Bharatha.

Population by ethnicity (2012)

Climate
It has a relatively cool climate because of its location in the central hills. In December the temperature drops to an average  with heavy mist cover during dawn. Polgolla and recently opened Morogahakanda dams believe to have some affects on the weather patterns in Akurana. Lowlands prone to regular flooding where the Haripotha or Ping Oya river flows along with the A9 Road, which joins with the Mahaweli River in Katugastota.

Education
There are two national schools in Akurana, Azhar College and Akurana Zahira College. Akurana Muslim Balika College is the only government Muslim girls college in Akurana.

In addition to the above schools there are primary feeding schools in the region which include
Azhar Model Primary School
Lukmaniya Maha Vidyalaya - Pangollamada
Kurundugahaela Muslim Vidyalaya
Thelumbugahawatte Muslim Vidyalaya
Neerella Muslim Vidyalaya
Kasawatte Muslim Vidyalaya
Kurugoda boys muslim vidyalaya

Hospital
Zia Hospital is the only government hospital operating in Akurana providing free health care to the public which was opened by the Pakistani President Muhammad Zia-ul-Haq, during the government of President J. R. Jayewardene.

Transport
Akurana is located on the A9 highway which makes it an easily accessible town.

References

Populated places in Kandy District